The Elyria City School district is a school district located in Elyria, Ohio. It consists of one high school, Three K-8 campuses, two K-4 elementary school buildings, and an early childhood education center. The Elyria City Schools maintains all public education and buildings.

History
In 2014 a gay-straight alliance appeared at Elyria High School. As a result, a group of parents in the school district threatened to reject an item on the May 2014 voting ballot, a renewal levy.

In November 2016, residents of Elyria passed Issue 23, an unprecedented school bond issue valued at $140 million with the goal of rebuilding all the district's schools (excluding Elyria High School) as well as building a state-of-the-art athletic complex on the city's south side to replace the decaying Ely Stadium, which was built in 1927.

Elyria City schools

High schools
Elyria High School — 9-12

Middle schools (on new K-8 campuses)
Northwood Middle School — 5-8
Eastern Heights Middle School — 5-8
Westwood Middle School — 5-8

Elementary schools
Westwood Elementary School — K-4 (on Westwood K-8 campus)
Northwood Elementary School - K-4 (on Northwood K-8 campus)
Eastern Heights Elementary School - K-4 (on Eastern Heights K-8 campus)
Ely Elementary School - K-4
Hamilton Elementary School - K-4

Other schools
Elyria Early Childhood Village (currently located at Central administrative offices, later to be relocated to former Crestwood building) - Preschool and Kindergarten

Closed schools
Due to tight budgets, the Elyria City Schools have closed several schools to cut back on costs. Students are redirected to the nearest school necessary.

Elyria West High School
Eastgate Elementary School
Edison Elementary School
Cascade Elementary School
Jefferson Elementary (formerly Junior High) School
Erie Elementary School
Roosevelt Elementary School
Spring Valley High School
Franklin Elementary School
Prospect Elementary School
Oakwood Elementary School
McKinley Elementary School
Crestwood Elementary School

References

External links
Elyria City Schools

Education in Lorain County, Ohio
Elyria, Ohio
School districts in Ohio